This is a list of protected areas of the U.S. state of Colorado.


Federal lands
The United States federal government owns 36.23% of Colorado's total land area.

National Park System
The National Park System includes 23 areas in Colorado. The National Park Service manages 18 of these 23 areas plus five National Wildernesses.

National Parks

The four National Parks within Colorado are:
Black Canyon of the Gunnison National Park near Montrose
Great Sand Dunes National Park and Preserve near Mosca
Mesa Verde National Park and UNESCO World Heritage Site near Cortez
Rocky Mountain National Park near Estes Park and Grand Lake

National Monuments

The nine National Monuments in Colorado are:
Browns Canyon National Monument near Nathrop (February 19, 2015, Obama)
Camp Hale-Continental Divide National Monument between Red Cliff and Leadville in the Eagle River valley (October 12, 2022, Biden)
Canyons of the Ancients National Monument near Cortez (June 9, 2000, Clinton)
Chimney Rock National Monument near Pagosa Springs (September 21, 2012, Obama)
Colorado National Monument near Grand Junction and Fruita (May 24, 1911, Taft)
Dinosaur National Monument near Dinosaur (80 acres October 4, 1915, Wilson, additional 200,000 acres July 14, 1938, F. Roosevelt)
Florissant Fossil Beds National Monument near Florissant (August 20, 1969, Nixon)
Hovenweep National Monument near Cortez (March 2, 1923, Harding)
Yucca House National Monument near Cortez (December 19, 1919, Wilson)

Two former National Monuments were elevated to National Park:
Black Canyon of the Gunnison National Monument (March 2, 1933, Hoover, to October 21, 1999)
Great Sand Dunes National Monument (March 17, 1932, Hoover, to September 24, 2004)

Two former National Monuments were abolished due to their remoteness:
Holy Cross National Monument near Minturn (May 11, 1929, Hoover, abolished August 3, 1950)
Wheeler National Monument near Creede (December 7, 1908, T. Roosevelt, abolished August 3, 1950)

National Historic Sites

The three National Historic Sites within Colorado are:
Amache National Historic Site near Granada
Bent's Old Fort National Historic Site near La Junta
Sand Creek Massacre National Historic Site near Chivington

National Recreation Areas

The two National Recreation Areas within Colorado are::
Arapaho National Recreation Area near Granby
Curecanti National Recreation Area near Gunnison

National Historic Trails

The four National Historic Trails that pass through Colorado are:
California National Historic Trail through Sedgwick County
Old Spanish National Historic Trail through southwestern Colorado
Pony Express National Historic Trail through Sedgwick County
Santa Fe National Historic Trail through southeastern Colorado

National Scenic Trail

The National Scenic Trail that passes through Colorado is:
Continental Divide National Scenic Trail along the Continental Divide of the Americas

National Forests

The United States Forest Service manages the 11 National Forests within Colorado.
Arapaho National Forest
Grand Mesa National Forest
Gunnison National Forest
Pike National Forest
Rio Grande National Forest
Roosevelt National Forest
Routt National Forest
San Isabel National Forest
San Juan National Forest
Uncompahgre National Forest
White River National Forest

National Grasslands

The United States Forest Service manages the two National Grasslands within Colorado.
Comanche National Grassland – southeastern Colorado
Pawnee National Grassland – northeastern Colorado

National Wildernesses

There are 44 National Wildernesses within Colorado. The United States Forest Service manages 34, the National Park Service manages four, the Bureau of Land Management manages three, the United States Forest Service and the Bureau of Land Management jointly manage two, and the United States Forest Service and the National Park Service jointly manage one National Wilderness.
Black Canyon of the Gunnison Wilderness
Black Ridge Canyons Wilderness
Buffalo Peaks Wilderness
Byers Peak Wilderness
Cache La Poudre Wilderness
Collegiate Peaks Wilderness
Comanche Peak Wilderness
Dominguez Canyon Wilderness
Eagles Nest Wilderness
Flat Tops Wilderness
Fossil Ridge Wilderness
Great Sand Dunes Wilderness
Greenhorn Mountain Wilderness
Gunnison Gorge Wilderness
Hermosa Creek Wilderness
Holy Cross Wilderness
Hunter-Fryingpan Wilderness
Indian Peaks Wilderness
James Peak Wilderness
La Garita Wilderness
Lizard Head Wilderness
Lost Creek Wilderness
Maroon Bells-Snowmass Wilderness
Mesa Verde Wilderness
Mount Evans Wilderness
Mount Massive Wilderness
Mount Sneffels Wilderness
Mount Zirkel Wilderness
Neota Wilderness
Never Summer Wilderness
Platte River Wilderness
Powderhorn Wilderness
Ptarmigan Peak Wilderness
Raggeds Wilderness
Rawah Wilderness
Rocky Mountain National Park Wilderness
Sangre de Cristo Wilderness
Sarvis Creek Wilderness
South San Juan Wilderness
Spanish Peaks Wilderness
Uncompahgre Wilderness
Vasquez Peak Wilderness
Weminuche Wilderness
West Elk Wilderness

National Conservation Areas

The Bureau of Land Management manages the three National Conservation Areas within Colorado.
Dominguez–Escalante National Conservation Area
Gunnison Gorge National Conservation Area
McInnis Canyons National Conservation Area

National Wildlife Refuges

The United States Fish and Wildlife Service manages the eight National Wildlife Refuges within Colorado.
Alamosa National Wildlife Refuge
Arapaho National Wildlife Refuge
Baca National Wildlife Refuge
Browns Park National Wildlife Refuge
Monte Vista National Wildlife Refuge
Rocky Flats National Wildlife Refuge
Rocky Mountain Arsenal National Wildlife Refuge
Two Ponds National Wildlife Refuge

Federally designated areas
The following areas are designated by the National Park Service, but reside on a variety of federal, state, county, city, town, and private lands.

National Heritage Areas

The three National Heritage Areas in Colorado are:
Cache La Poudre River Corridor National Heritage Area
Sangre de Cristo National Heritage Area
South Park National Heritage Area

National Historic Landmarks

The 26 National Historic Landmarks in Colorado are:
Bent's Old Fort
Burlingon Carousel
Central City/Black Hawk Historic District
Colorado Chautauqua
Colorado Fuel and Iron Company Administrative Complex
Cripple Creek Historic District
Cumbres and Toltec Scenic Railroad
Denver Civic Center
Durango-Silverton Narrow-Gauge Railroad
Georgetown-Silver Plume Historic District
Granada War Relocation Center
Leadville Historic District
Lindenmeier site
Lowry Ruin
Ludlow Tent Colony Site
Mesa Verde Administrative District
Pikes Peak
Pike's Stockade
Raton Pass
Red Rocks Park
Rocky Mountain National Park Administration Building
Shenandoah-Dives (Mayflower) Mill
Silverton Historic District
Telluride Historic District
Trujillo Homesteads
United States Air Force Academy, Cadet Area

National Natural Landmarks

The 16 National Natural Landmarks in Colorado are:
Big Spring Creek 
Garden of the Gods 
Garden Park Fossil Area 
Hanging Lake 
Indian Springs Trace Fossil Site 
Lost Creek Scenic Area  
Morrison-Golden Fossil Areas  
Raton Mesa  
Roxborough State Park
Russell Lakes
Sand Creek  
Slumgullion Earthflow  
Spanish Peaks  
Sulphur Cave and Spring
Summit Lake
West Bijou Site

National Recreation Trails

The 28 federally designated National Recreation Trails in Colorado are:
Apex National Recreation Trail near Golden
Barr National Recreation Trail between Manitou Springs and Pikes Peak
Bear Creek National Recreation Trail near Ouray
Big Dry Creek National Recreation Trail through Westminster
Calico National Recreation Trail near Dolores
Crag Crest National Recreation Trail near Cedaredge
Devils Head National Recreation Trail near Sedalia
Fish Creek Falls National Recreation Trail near Steamboat Springs
Grays Peak National Recreation Trail near Silver Plume
Greyrock Mountain National Recreation Trail near Laporte
Highline Canal National Recreation Trail through metropolitan Denver
Highline Loop National Recreation Trail near Dolores
Lake Fork National Recreation Trail near South Fork
Mineral Belt National Recreation Trail near Leadville
Mount Evans National Recreation Trail near Idaho Springs
Mount McConnel National Recreation Trail near Laporte
Petroglyph Point National Recreation Trail in Mesa Verde National Park
Platte River Greenway National Recreation Trail through metropolitan Denver
Poudre River National Recreation Trail between Greeley and Windsor
Rocky Mountain Arsenal National Recreation Trails near Denver
Round Mountain National Recreation Trail near Loveland
Swamp Park National Recreation Trail near Steamboat Springs
Two Elk National Recreation Trail near Vail
Two Ponds National Recreation Trail in Arvada
Vail Pass National Recreation Trail between Copper Mountain and Vail
West Lost Trail Creek National Recreation Trail near Creede
Wheeler Ten Mile National Recreation Trail between Frisco and Copper Mountain
White House Ranch National Recreation Trail in Colorado Springs

National Register of Historic Places

There are more than 1,500 Colorado sites on the National Register of Historic Places.

Wild and Scenic River

The Wild and Scenic River in Colorado is:
Cache la Poudre Wild and Scenic River

Areas of Critical Environmental Concern

The Bureau of Land Management has designated 88 Areas of Critical Environmental Concern in western Colorado.

State lands

Colorado State Parks

Colorado Parks and Wildlife manages the 43 Colorado State Parks.
Arkansas Headwaters Recreation Area
Barr Lake State Park
Boyd Lake State Park
Castlewood Canyon State Park
Chatfield State Park
Cherry Creek State Park
Cheyenne Mountain State Park
Crawford State Park (Colorado)
Eldorado Canyon State Park
Eleven Mile State Park
Elkhead State Park
Fishers Peak State Park
Golden Gate Canyon State Park
Harvey Gap State Park
Highline Lake State Park
Jackson Lake State Park (Colorado)
James M. Robb – Colorado River State Park
John Martin Reservoir State Park
Lake Pueblo State Park
Lathrop State Park
Lone Mesa State Park
Lory State Park
Mancos State Park
Mueller State Park
Navajo State Park
North Sterling State Park
Paonia State Park
Pearl Lake State Park
Ridgway State Park
Rifle Falls State Park
Rifle Gap State Park
Roxborough State Park
Spinney Mountain State Park
St. Vrain State Park
Stagecoach State Park
State Forest State Park
Staunton State Park
Steamboat Lake State Park
Sweitzer Lake State Park
Sweetwater Lake State Park
Sylvan Lake State Park
Trinidad Lake State Park
Vega State Park
Yampa River State Park

Colorado Wildlife Areas

Colorado Parks and Wildlife manages the 307 Colorado State Wildlife Areas.

State designated areas

Colorado Natural Areas

The Colorado Department of Natural Resources has designated 95 Colorado Natural Areas.
Aiken Canyon Natural Area
Antero-Salt Creek Natural Area
Arikaree River Natural Area
Badger Wash Natural Area
Blacks Gulch Natural Area
Blue Mountain Natural Area
Bonny Prairie Natural Area
Boulder Mountain Park Natural Area in Boulder Mountain Park
Brush Creek Fen Natural Area
California Park Natural Area
Castlewood Canyon Natural Area in Castlewood Canyon State Park
Chalk Bluffs Natural Area
Colorado Tallgrass Prairie Natural Area
Comanche Grassland Lesser Prairie Chicken Natural Area in Comanche National Grassland
Copeland Willow Carr Natural Area
Corral Bluffs Natural Area
Cross Mountain Canyon Natural Area
Dakota Hogback Natural Area commonly known as Dinosaur Ridge in Matthews/Winters Park
Deer Gulch Natural Area
Dome Rock Natural Area in Dome Rock State Wildlife Area
Droney Gulch Natural Area
Duck Creek Natural Area
Dudley Bluffs Natural Area
East Lost Park Natural Area in Pike National Forest
East Sand Dunes Natural Area in State Forest State Park
Elephant Rocks Natural Area
Escalante Canyon Natural Area
Fairview Natural Area
Fourmile Creek Natural Area
Fruita Paleontological Locality
Garden Park Fossil Locality
Gateway Palisade Natural Area
Geneva Basin Iron Fens Natural Area
Gothic Research Natural Area in Gunnison National Forest
Gunnison Gravels Research Natural Area
Haviland Lake Natural Area in Haviland Lake State Wildlife Area
High Creek Fen Natural Area
High Mesa Grassland Natural Area
Hoosier Ridge Research Natural Area on the Continental Divide in Pike National Forest and White River National Forest
Hurricane Canyon Natural Area in Pike National Forest
Indian Spring Natural Area
Indian Springs Trace Fossil Locality
Irish Canyon Natural Area
Jimmy Creek Natural Area
Ken-Caryl Ranch Natural Area
Kremmling Cretaceous Ammonite Locality
Limestone Ridge Natural Area
Logan Wash Mine Natural Area
Lookout Mountain Natural Area
Lower Greasewood Creek Natural Area
McElmo Natural Area
Mexican Cut Natural Area
Mini-Wheeler Natural Area
Miramonte Reservoir Natural Area in Dan Noble State Wildlife Area
Mishak Lakes Natural Area
Mount Callahan Natural Area
Mount Callahan Saddle Natural Area
Mount Emmons Iron Fen Natural Area in Gunnison National Forest
Mount Goliath Natural Area in Arapaho National Forest
Narraguinnep Natural Area in San Juan National Forest
Needle Rock Natural Area
North Park Phacelia Natural Area
Orient Mine Natural Area
Owl Canyon Pinyon Grove Natural Area
Pagosa Skyrocket Natural Area
Paradise Park Natural Area in Rocky Mountain National Park
Park Creek Hogback Natural Area
Pyramid Rock Natural Area
Rabbit Valley Natural Area
Rajadero Canyon Natural Area
Raven Ridge Natural Area
Redcloud Peak Natural Area
Rough Canyon Natural Area
Roxborough Natural Area in and near Roxborough State Park
Ryan Gulch Natural Area
Saddle Mountain Natural Area in Pike National Forest
San Miguel River at Tabeguache Creek Natural Area
Sand Creek Natural Area
Shell Duck Creek Natural Area
Shell Rock Natural Area
Slumgullion Earthflow Natural Area in San Juan National Forest
South Beaver Creek Natural Area
South Boulder Creek Natural Area
South Cathedral Bluffs Natural Area
Specimen Mountain Research Natural Area in Rocky Mountain National Park
Staunton Natural Area in Staunton State Park
Tamarack Ranch Natural Area in Tamarack Ranch State Wildlife Area
Treasurevault Mountain Natural Area
Trinidad K-T Boundary Natural Area in Trinidad Lake State Park
Two Buttes Natural Area
Unaweep Seep Research Natural Area
Wacker Ranch Natural Area
West Creek Natural Area in Rocky Mountain National Park
Wheeler Geologic Natural Area in the La Garita Wilderness of Rio Grande National Forest
White Rocks Natural Area
Yanks Gulch/Upper Greasewood Creek Natural Area
Zapata Falls Natural Area

Colorado Scenic and Historic Byways

The Colorado Scenic and Historic Byways Commission has designated 26 Colorado Scenic and Historic Byways:
Alpine Loop Back Country Byway
Cache la Poudre-North Park Scenic Byway
Collegiate Peaks Scenic Byway
Colorado River Headwaters National Scenic Byway
Dinosaur Diamond National Scenic Byway
Flat Tops Trail Scenic Byway
Frontier Pathways National Scenic Byway
Gold Belt Tour Scenic and Historic Byway
Grand Mesa National Scenic Byway
Guanella Pass Scenic Byway
Highway of Legends National Scenic Byway
Lariat Loop Scenic and Historic Byway
Los Caminos Antiguos Scenic and Historic Byway
Mount Evans Scenic Byway
Pawnee Pioneer Trails Scenic Byway
Peak to Peak Scenic Byway
San Juan Skyway Scenic and Historic Byway
Santa Fe Trail Scenic and Historic Byway
Silver Thread Scenic and Historic Byway
South Platte River Trail Scenic and Historic Byway
Top of the Rockies National Scenic Byway
Tracks Across Borders Scenic and Historic Byway
Trail of the Ancients Scenic and Historic Byway
Trail Ridge Road/Beaver Meadow National Scenic Byway
Unaweep Tabeguache Scenic Byway
West Elk Loop Scenic and Historic Byway

Regional trails

The following transcontinental hiking trail was established by the American Discovery Trail Society.
American Discovery Trail
The following hiking trail across the Southern Rocky Mountains is maintained by the Colorado Trail Foundation.
Colorado Trail
The following three single-track mountain bike trails are maintained by the Colorado Plateau Mountain Bike Trail Association and the Bureau of Land Management.
Kokopelli Trail
Paradox Trail
Tabeguache Trail

Bicycle routes

The following four bicycle touring routes through Colorado are regularly scouted by the Adventure Cycling Association.
Great Divide Mountain Bike Route
Great Parks Bicycle Route
TransAmerica Trail Bicycle Route
Western Express Bicycle Route

See also

Bibliography of Colorado
Index of Colorado-related articles
Outline of Colorado
Protected areas of the United States
List of national conservation lands in Colorado

Notes

References

External links

Colorado state government website
Colorado Department of Natural Resources website
Colorado Parks & Wildlife website
Colorado tourism website
History Colorado website
United States federal government website
United States Department of the Interior website
Bureau of Land Management website
National Park Service website
United States Fish and Wildlife Service website
United States Department of Agriculture website
United States Forest Service website

 
Colorado geography-related lists
Colorado history-related lists
Tourism in Colorado
Tourist attractions in Colorado
Colorado, List of protected areas of